Alfred Kütt may refer to:

 Alfred Kütt (politician) (1894–?), Estonian politician 
 Alfred Kütt (actor) (1924–1962), Estonian actor